Events from the year 1646 in France

Incumbents
 Monarch – Louis XIV
Regent: Anne of Austria

Events

 10 October – France takes Dunkirk from the Spanish Netherlands for the first time.

Births

17 February – Pierre Le Pesant, sieur de Boisguilbert, lawmaker (died 1714)
10 October – Françoise-Marguerite de Sévigné, aristocrat (died 1705)

Deaths
12 May – Énemond Massé, Jesuit missionary (born 1575)
14 June – Jean Armand de Maillé-Brézé, admiral (born 1619)
22 June – Daniel Dumonstier, artist (born 1574)
27 June – Achille d'Étampes de Valençay, military leader and Catholic Cardinal (born 1593)
22 September – Jean François Niceron, mathematician (born 1613)
23 December – François Maynard, poet (born 1582)

See also

References

1640s in France